The 1950 National League Division Three was the fourth season of British speedway's National League Division Three

The league was reduced from 13 teams to 10. Halifax Dukes, Plymouth, Yarmouth and Hanley had all moved up to Division Two whilst Hastings Saxons dropped out. The two new sides were Aldershot Shots and St Austell Gulls whilst Tamworth changed their nickname from 'Hounds' to 'Tammies'.

Oxford Cheetahs, who had finished bottom of the table during their inaugural league season in 1949, rose spectacularly up the league to win the title. The Oxford team was made up from an entirely new set of riders including Harry Saunders, signed as captain from Tamworth for £750, Pat Clarke from Rayleigh for £250, Bill Osborne from Walthamstow, Raymond Buster Brown from Wembley and Eric Irons from Cradley.

Ken Middleditch of Poole topped the averages.

Final table

Leading Averages

National Trophy Stage Three
 For Stage Two - see Stage Two
 For Stage Three - see Stage Three

The 1950 National Trophy was the 13th edition of the Knockout Cup. The Trophy consisted of three stages; stage one was for the third division clubs, stage two was for the second division clubs and stage three was for the top tier clubs. The winner of stage one would qualify for stage two and the winner of stage two would qualify for the third and final stage. Oxford won stage one and therefore qualified for stage two.

Third Division Qualifying First round

Third Division Qualifying Second round

Third Division Qualifying semifinals

Qualifying final
First leg

Second leg

See also
List of United Kingdom Speedway League Champions
Knockout Cup (speedway)

References

Speedway National League Division Three
Speedway National League Division 3
1950 in speedway